Undercover High is a Canadian youth comedy series, which premiered on YTV in 2014. A hidden camera prank show, the series staged pranks on students at high schools.

The series was produced by General Purpose Entertainment, and hosted by Lisa Gilroy, who was also a host of YTV.

Gilroy received a Canadian Screen Award nomination for Best Host in a Children's, Preschool or Youth Program or Series at the 3rd Canadian Screen Awards in 2015, and the series was nominated for  
Best Children's or Youth Non-Fiction Program or Series at the 6th Canadian Screen Awards.

References

External links

2014 Canadian television series debuts
2016 Canadian television series endings
2010s Canadian  comedy television series
2010s Canadian high school television series
YTV (Canadian TV channel) original programming
Hidden camera television series
Television series about teenagers